James Hoste may refer to:
 James Hoste (Castle Rising MP) (1633–1699)
 James Hoste (Bramber MP) (1705–1744)